Francisco Solano López (October 26, 1928 – August 12, 2011) was an Argentine comics artist. He was the co-creator of El Eternauta.

Career
Born in  Buenos Aires, Solano López began his career in 1953 working for the publishing house Columba where he illustrated the series Perico y Guillerma. Working for Editorial Abril he met Héctor Germán Oesterheld, assigned to illustrate his series Bull Rocket for the magazine Misterix. They collaborated on the series Pablo Maran and Uma-Uma, before joining to start Oesterheld's publishing house Editorial Frontera. For the Frontera first publication of the monthly Hora Cero, the team produced the series Rolo el marciano adoptivo and El Héroe. López also alternated as artist on the Ernie Pike series with Hugo Pratt, Jorge Moliterni and José Antonio Muñoz. On September 4, 1957 in the publication of Hora Cero Suplemento Semanal, the science-fiction series El Eternauta made its first appearance.

A success, El Eternauta came to the attention of the authorities as the series featured commentary of the political situation of Argentina and neighbouring Chile, prompting Solano López to flee for Spain to avoid possible arrest. In 1959 Solano López began working for Fleetway in Madrid and later London, producing artwork for a host of series, including Galaxus: The Thing from Outer Space, Pete's Pocket Army, The Drowned World, Janus Stark, and Kelly's Eye.

Having returned to Argentina, Solano López resumed collaboration with Oesterheld on El Eternauta II in 1968 with a new publishing house, Editorial Records. He also started work on science-fiction saga Slot-Barr with writer Ricardo Barreiro, and the police series Evaristo with Carlos Sampayo. In the late 1970s Solano López again fled Argentina following persecution from the authorities, and from Madrid he arranged the publication of both El Eternauta and Slot-Barr with the Italian magazines LancioStory and Skorpio.

In the 1990s, Solano López produced work in the erotic comics genre, achieving hits with El Prostíbulo del Terror, from a story by Barreiro, and Silly Symphony, made for the magazine Kiss Comix.

Solano López died on August 12, 2011 from a cerebral hemorrhage.

References

External links
 Francisco Solano López biography on Lambiek Comiclopedia
 Francisco Solano López biography on Dan Dare
Francisco Solano López UK publications Dan Dare

1928 births
2011 deaths
Argentine comics artists
Argentine erotic artists